Al-Asmakh Tower (formerly the IBQ Tower) is a building in West Bay Area in Doha, Qatar. Its design was inspired by New York City landmark Empire State Building. It has five basements and 34 floors.

References

Doha
Buildings and structures in Doha
Skyscrapers in Doha
Skyscraper office buildings
Office buildings completed in 2017